Princess Edward may refer to:

 Princess Victoria of Saxe-Coburg-Saalfeld (1786–1861), The Princess Edward, Duchess of Kent
 Katharine, Duchess of Kent (born 1933), Princess Edward, Duchess of Kent
 Sophie, Duchess of Edinburgh (born 1965), The Princess Edward, Duchess of Edinburgh